Brenda Forbes (14 January 1909 – 11 September 1996) was a British-born American actress of stage and screen.

Personal life
Born as Dorothy Brenda Taylor in Wandsworth, London, the daughter of Ernest John and Ethel Louise Taylor. Her mother was actress Mary Forbes, and her elder brother was actor Ralph Forbes (né Ralph Forbes Taylor), she made her first film appearance in 1935 and her last in 1995. She appeared on Broadway between 1931 and 1985, mostly in revivals of classics.

Career
Forbes created the role of the outspoken maid, Wilson, in the original production of The Barretts of Wimpole Street opposite Katharine Cornell. She played the role in various revivals as well. She co-starred as Lady Vale in the 1967 musical Darling of the Day in which she and Peter Woodthorpe introduced the song Panache and appeared in the 1976 revival of My Fair Lady as Mrs. Higgins; also in that production was George Rose whom she starred with in the 1986 all star cast revival of Aren't We All?

On screen she appeared in several films over a 50-year period including The Imperfect Lady (1935) and Mrs. Miniver (1942). Her last role, a small one, was in The Jerky Boys: The Movie.

Family
She was married to Merrill Shepard from 1947 until his death in 1986; they had no children.

Death
She died from cancer in 1996, aged 87, in New York City.

Filmography

References

External links

1909 births
1996 deaths
Actresses from London
American film actresses
American stage actresses
British film actresses
British stage actresses
Deaths from cancer in New York (state)
British emigrants to the United States
People from Wandsworth
20th-century American actresses
20th-century British actresses
20th-century English women
20th-century English people